The Seamen's Church Institute is a social service organization and historic building located in Newport, Rhode Island.  Founded in 1919, the Institute's mission is to provide men and women of the sea and persons referred from the community a safe haven in which they may find comfort, recreation and benefit.

History
The Church Institute building was built in 1930 by Edith and Maude Wetmore, daughters of Governor and Senator George Peabody Wetmore (owner of Chateau-sur-Mer). It contains an ornately painted chapel (the work of muralist Durr Freedley), as well as a small library, restaurant, laundry rooms, Wi-Fi and meeting rooms. The building, designed by the architect Frederic Rhinelander King in a Colonial Revival style, was added to the National Register of Historic Places in 1983.

See also
National Register of Historic Places listings in Newport County, Rhode Island

References

External links

Photos and history
Official Website

Residential buildings on the National Register of Historic Places in Rhode Island
Buildings and structures completed in 1930
United States Merchant Marine
Social welfare charities based in the United States
Anglican organizations
Organizations based in Rhode Island
Buildings and structures in Newport, Rhode Island
National Register of Historic Places in Newport, Rhode Island